Sir Francis Englefield (c. 1522 – 1596) was an English courtier and Roman Catholic exile.

Family

Francis Englefield, born about 1522, was the eldest son of Thomas Englefield (1488–1537) of Englefield, Berkshire, Justice of the Common Pleas, and Elizabeth Throckmorton (died 1543), sister of Sir George Throckmorton (died 1552), and daughter of Sir Robert Throckmorton (died 1518) of the well-known Catholic family of Coughton Court in Warwickshire. His grandfather, Sir Thomas Englefield (1455–1514), was an adviser to Henry VIII during the King's youth, and Speaker of the House of Commons in 1497 and 1510.

Englefield had a brother, John Englefield (died 1567), who married Margaret Fitton, the daughter of Sir Edward Fitton (died 1547/48) of Gawsworth and his wife, Mary Harbottle (died 1557), and three sisters, Margaret Englefield (died 1563), who married firstly, George Carew (died 1538), and secondly, Sir Edward Saunders (1506–1576), Chief Baron of the Exchequer; Anne Englefield, who married Humphrey Coningsby (1515–1569); and Susan Englefield, who married Humphrey Barnes.

Career
Francis, who succeeded his father in 1537, was too young to have taken any part in the opposition to the abolition of the Roman jurisdiction and dissolution of the monasteries; and he acquiesced in these measures to the extent of taking the oath of royal supremacy, serving as High Sheriff of Berkshire and Oxfordshire in 1546–1547. In 1545 he purchased the manor of Tilehurst, which had belonged to Reading Abbey. He was knighted at the coronation of Edward VI of England in February 1547.

But the progress of the Reformation during that reign alienated him, and he became a member of the household of Princess Mary in 1549. In August of that year he was sent to the Tower for permitting Mass to be celebrated in Mary's household. He was released in the following March, and permitted to resume his duties in Mary's service. But in February 1553 he was again summoned before the privy council, and may have been in confinement at the crisis of July; perhaps he was only released on Marys triumph, for his name does not appear among those who exerted themselves on her behalf before the middle of August.

He was then sworn a member of the privy council like many others who owed their promotion to their loyalty rather than to their political abilities. Their numbers swelled the privy council and sadly impaired its efficiency; but Mary resisted the various attempts to get rid of them because she liked staunch friends, and regarded them as a salutary check upon the abler but less scrupulous members who had served Edward VI as well as herself. Englefield sat as M.P. for Berkshire in all Mary's parliaments except that of April 1554, but received no higher political office than the lucrative mastership of the court of wards.

Exile
He was an ardent supporter of the Marian persecutions, was present at Hooper's trial, sought Ascham's ruin, and naturally lost his office and his seat on the privy council at Elizabeth's succession. He retired to the continent of Europe before May 1559, and lived in exile for the remainder of his life.

Englefleld lived first at Rome, then in the Low Countries, and finally at Valladolid. He was blind for the last twenty years of his life, and received a pension of six hundred crowns from Philip. He had been outlawed in 1564 and his estates sequestered, but his correspondence with the pope and the King of Spain on behalf of Mary Queen of Scots brought an act of attainder against Englefield in 1585. Even then some legal difficulties stood in the way of their appropriation by the crown, for Englefield, obviously with an eye to this contingency, had conditionally settled them on his nephew, Francis Englefield (c. 1561 – 26 October 1631). The long arguments on the point are given in Cokes Reports, and a further Act of Parliament was passed in 1592 confirming the forfeiture to the crown (35 Eliz. I. c. 5). The nephew, however, eventually recovered some of the family estates, and was created a baronet in 1612. His uncle was alive in September 1596, but apparently died at Valladolid about the end of that year. His tomb there used to be shown to visitors as that of an eminent man.

Englefield's nephew, namesake and heir, Sir Francis Englefield (c. 1561 – 26 October 1631), 1st Baronet Englefield, married Jane Browne, the daughter of Anthony Browne (22 July 1552 – 29 June 1592), and Mary Dormer, the daughter of Sir William Dormer (died 1575). Jane Browne was the niece of Mary Wriothesley, Countess of Southampton (22 July 1552 – 4 November 1607), and the granddaughter of Anthony Browne, 1st Viscount Montague (died 19 October 1592) by his first wife, Jane Radcliffe.

Footnotes

References

External links
 Coningsby, Humphrey (1516–1569), History of Parliament
Englefield pedigree
Throckmorton pedigree
 Englefield House, Berkshire

 Sir Francis Englefield (died 1621)

1520s births
1596 deaths
Knights Bachelor
English knights
English Roman Catholics
High Sheriffs of Berkshire
High Sheriffs of Oxfordshire
People from Englefield, Berkshire
Members of the Parliament of England for Berkshire
16th-century Roman Catholics
English MPs 1553 (Mary I)
English MPs 1554–1555
English MPs 1555
English MPs 1558